Scotinotylus patellatus is a spider in the species of Linyphiidae or "sheet weaver" found in Canada and Alaska, United States. It was first described by Emerton a Canadian Entomologist in 1917.  The Scotinotylus patellatus is also known as "A Dwarf Weaver".

References

Linyphiidae
Spiders of North America
Spiders described in 1917